Geoagiu can refer to the following places in Romania:

Geoagiu, a town in Hunedoara County
Geoagiu de Sus, a village in the commune Stremț, Alba County
Geoagiu (Hunedoara), a right tributary of the river Mureș in Hunedoara County
Geoagiu (Alba), a right tributary of the river Mureș in Alba County